Harvey Hull Johnson (September 7, 1808 – February 4, 1896) was a U.S. Representative from Ohio for one term from 1853 to 1855.

Biography 
Born in West Rutland, Vermont, Johnson attended the common schools and Middlebury Academy.
He studied law.
He was admitted to the bar in 1833 and commenced practice in Akron, Ohio.
Postmaster of Akron in 1837.
He moved to Ashland, Ohio, about 1848.

Johnson was elected as a Democrat to the Thirty-third Congress (March 4, 1853 – March 3, 1855).
He was an unsuccessful candidate for reelection in 1854.
He moved to Minnesota in 1855 and settled in Winona.
He resumed the practice of law.
He served as president of the Winona & St. Peter Railroad during its construction to Rochester.
He moved to Owatonna, Minnesota, in 1865 and engaged in the practice of law.
He served as mayor and city justice 1867-1870.

Death 
He died in Owatonna, Minnesota, February 4, 1896.
He was interred in Forest Hill Cemetery.

Sources

1808 births
1896 deaths
People from West Rutland, Vermont
People from Ashland, Ohio
Mayors of places in Minnesota
People from Owatonna, Minnesota
19th-century American politicians
Middlebury College alumni
Democratic Party members of the United States House of Representatives from Ohio